The following is a list of players, both past and current, who appeared in at least one regular season or postseason game for the Pittsburgh Steelers NFL franchise. Note: The years listed are those in which players made an appearance in a game.

A

 Walter Abercrombie (1982–1987)
 Ed Adamchik (1965)
 Bob Adams (1969–1971)
 Flozell Adams (2010)
 Mike Adams (1997)
 Mike Adams (2012–2014)
 Montravius Adams (2021–present)
 Ben Agajanian (1945)
 Dick Alban (1956–1959)
 Tom Alberghini (1945)
 Art Albrecht (1942)
 John Alderton (1953)
 Brent Alexander (2000–2003)
 Chuck Allen (1970–1971)
 Cortez Allen (2011–2015)
 Duane Allen (1965)
 Jimmy Allen (1974–1977)
 Lou Allen (1950–1951)
 Will Allen (2010–2015)
 Don Alley (1969)
 John Allred (2002)
 Lyneal Alston (1987)
 Tyson Alualu (2017-present)
 Rudy Andabaker (1952–1954)
 Anthony Anderson (1979)
 Art Anderson (1963)
 Chet Anderson (1967)
 Fred Anderson (1978–1979)
 Gary Anderson (1982–1994)
 Jesse Anderson (1992)
 Larry Anderson (1978–1981)
 Mel Anderson (1987)
 Ralph Anderson (1971–1972)
 Steve Apke (1987)
 Dri Archer (2014–2015)
 Al Arndt (1935)
 Dick Arndt (1967–1970)
 Brian Arnfelt (2013)
 David Arnold (1989)
 Jahine Arnold (1996–1998)
 Jay Arnold (1941)
 Corwin "Corrie" Artman (1933)
 Willie Asbury (1966–1968)
 Bert Askson (1970–1971)
 Dale Atkeson (1958)
 Frank Atkinson (1963)
 Steve August (1984)
 Gene Augusterfer (1935)
 Ocie Austin (1970–1971)
 Steve Avery (1991–1995)
 Buddy Aydelette (1987)

B

 Rich Badar (1967)
 Matt Bahr (1979–1980)
 Henry Bailey (1997–1998)
 Patrick Bailey (2008–2009)
 Rodney Bailey (2001–2003, 2006)
 Conway Baker (1944)
 Dallas Baker (2008)
 John Baker (1962–1967)
 Tim Baker (2001)
 Lou Baldacci (1956)
 Gary Ballman (1962–1966)
 Bob Balog (1949–1951)
 John Banaszak (1975–1981)
 Warren Bankston (1969–1973)
 Vince Banonis (1944)
 Pete Barbolak (1949)
 Ed Barker (1953)
 Johnnie Barnes (1995)
 Reggie Barnes (1993)
 Walt Barnes (1952)
 Tom Barnett (1959–1960)
 Fred Barry (1970)
 Earl Bartlett (1939)
 Mike Basrak (1937–1938)
 Dick Bassi (1941)
 Baron Batch (2012)
 Charlie Batch (2003, 2005–2012)
 Marco Battaglia (2002)
 Arnaz Battle (2010–2011)
 Ainsley Battles (2000, 2004)
 Kelvin Beachum (2012–2015)
 Byron Beams (1959–1960)
 Tom Beasley (1978–1983)
 Chuck Beatty (1969–1972)
 Ed Beatty (1957–1961)
 Wayland Becker (1939)
 Mark Behning (1985–1987)
 Kendrell Bell (2001–2004)
 Le'Veon Bell (2013–2019)
 Myron Bell (1994–2001)
 Richard Bell (1990)
 Theo Bell (1976–1980)
 George Belotti (1959)
 Albert Bentley (1992)
 Mitch Berger (2008)
 Dave Bernard (1942)
 Ed Bernet (1955–1958)
 Jordan Berry (2015–2020)
 Greg Best (1983)
 Jerome Bettis (1996–2005)
 Tom Bettis (1962)
 Frank Billock (1937)
 Craig Bingham (1982–1987)
 John Binotto (1942)
 Don Bishop (1958–1959)
 Harold Bishop (1998)
 Charlie Bivins (1967)
 Todd Blackledge (1988–1989)
 Will Blackwell (1997–2001)
 Antwon Blake (2013–2015)
 Brian Blankenship (1987–1991)
 Greg Blankenship (1976)
 Rocky Bleier (1968–1980)
 LeGarrette Blount (2014)
 Mel Blount (1970–1983)
 Fred Bohannon (1982–1983)
 Rocky Boiman (2009)
 Nick Bolkovac (1953–1954)
 Randal Bond (1939)
 Ernie Bonelli (1946)
 Steve Bono (1987–1988)
 Clarence Booth (1944)
 Chris Boswell (2015–present)
 Kirk Botkin (1996–1997)
 Emil Boures (1982–1985)
 Tony Bova (1942–1947)
 R.J. Bowers (2001)
 Bill Bowman (1957)
 Sam Boyd (1939–1940)
 Jim Boyle (1987–1988)
 Ed Bradley (1972–1975)
 Charlie Bradshaw (1961–1966)
 Jim Bradshaw (1963–1967)
 Terry Bradshaw (1970–1983)
 Jeff Brady (1991)
 Pat Brady (1952–1955)
 Art Brandau (1945–1946)
 Jim Brandt (1952–1954)
 Maury Bray (1935–1936)
 Bill Breeden (1937)
 Rod Breedlove (1965–1967)
 Gene Breen (1965–1966)
 Ed Brett (1936–1937)
 Pete Brewster (1959–1960)
 Bubby Brister (1986–1992)
 Jessie Britt (1986)
 Ralph Britt (1987)
 Barrett Brooks (2004–2005)
 Al Brosky (1954)
 Fred Broussard (1955)
 Angelo Brovelli (1933–1934)
 Anthony Brown (1999)
 Antonio Brown (2010–2019)
 Chad Brown (1993–1996, 2006)
 Chris Brown (1984–1985)
 Curtis Brown (2011–2013)
 Dante Brown (2004)
 Dave Brown (1975)
 Dee Brown (2003)
 Ed Brown (1962–1965)
 Ernie Brown (1999–2000)
 J. B. Brown (1997)
 Justin Brown (2014)
 John Brown (1967–1971)
 Kris Brown (1999–2001)
 Lance Brown (1995–1999)
 Larry Brown (1971–1984)
 Tom Brown (1942)
 Henry "Hank" Bruder (1940)
 Mark Bruener (1995–2003)
 Boyd Brumbaugh (1939–1941)
 Jim Brumfield (1971)
 Dewey Brundage (1954)
 Fred Bruney (1956–1957)
 John Bruno (1987)
 Corbin Bryant (2011)
 Fernando Bryant (2008–2009)
 Hubie Bryant (1970)
 Martavis Bryant (2014–2017)
 Felix Bucek (1946)
 Brentson Buckner (1994–1996)
 Carl Buda (1945)
 Rudy Bukich (1960–1961)
 Chester "Chet" Bulger (1944)
 Amos Bullocks (1966)
 John Burleson (1933)
 Joe Burnett (2009)
 Len Burnett (1961)
 Tom Burnette (1938)
 Josh Burr (2002–2004)
 John Burrell (1962–1964)
 Plaxico Burress (2000–2004, 2012–2013)
 Artie Burns (2016–2019)
 Devin Bush Jr. (2019–2022)
 Bill Butler (1961)
 Crezdon Butler (2010)
 Drew Butler (2012)
 Jack Butler (1950–1963)
 Jim Butler (1965–1967)
 John Butler (1943–1944)
 Frank Bykowski (1940)

C

 Larry Cabrelli (1943)
 Bill Cahill (1973)
 Ralph Calcagni (1947)
 Dean Caliguire (1991)
 Jack Call (1959)
 Lee Calland (1969–1972)
 Chris Calloway (1990–1991)
 Tom Calvin (1952–1955)
 Paul Cameron (1954)
 Bob Campbell (1969)
 Dick Campbell (1958–1960)
 Don Campbell (1939–1940)
 Glenn Campbell (1935)
 John Campbell (1965–1969)
 Leon Campbell (1955)
 Russ Campbell (1992)
 Scott Campbell (1984–1986)
 Rocco Canale (1943)
 Wayne Capers (1983–1984)
 Dick Capp (1968)
 Dom Cara (1937–1938)
 Joe Cardwell (1937)
 Preston Carpenter (1960–1963)
 Gregg Carr (1985–1988)
 Rodney Carter (1986–1989)
 Tyrone Carter (2004–2009)
 Chris Carter (2011–2013)
 Keith Cash (1991)
 Cy Casper (1935)
 Mark Catano (1984–1985)
 John Cenci (1956)
 Garth Chamberlain (1945)
 Lynn Chandnois (1950–1956)
 Ernie Cheatham (1951–1954)
 Edgar Cherry (1939)
 Chuck Cherundolo (1941–1942, 1945–1948)
 Dick Christy (1958–1959)
 Joe Cibulas (1945)
 Ben Ciccone (1934–1935)
 Gene Cichowski (1957–1958)
 Gus Cifelli (1954)
 Bob Cifers (1947–1948)
 Jim Clack (1971–1977)
 Kendrick Clancy (2000–2004)
 Gail Clark (1973)
 James Clark (1933–1934)
 Mike Clark (1964–1967)
 Reggie Clark (1994)
 Ryan Clark (2006–2013)
 Spark Clark (1987)
 John Clay (2011)
 Chase Claypool (2020–2022)
 Harvey Clayton (1983–1986)
 Henry Clement (1961–1962)
 Johnny Clement (1946–1948)
 Kyle Clement (2008)
 Jackie Cline (1987)
 Tony Cline (1999)
 Joey Clinkscales (1987–1988)
 Marvin Cobb (1980)
 Nakia Codie (2000–2001)
 Ricardo Colclough (2004–2007)
 Reggie Coldagelli (1940)
 Mason Cole (2022–present)
 Robin Cole (1977–1987)
 Terry Cole (1970)
 Andre Coleman (1997–1998)
 LaMonte Coleman (1995)
 Max Coley (1969–1971)
 Mike Collier (1975–1976)
 Reggie Collier (1987)
 Jack Collins (1962)
 Willie Colon (2006–2012)
 Craig Colquitt (1978–1984)
 Chris Combs (2000–2001)
 Tony Compagno (1946–1948)
 Dick Compton (1967–1968)
 Merlyn Condit (1940–1946)
 Steve Conley (1996–1998)
 Dick Conn (1974)
 Mike Connelly (1968)
 Rameel Connor (2001)
 James Conner (2017–2020)
 Chris Conrad (1998–1999)
 Enio Conti (1943)
 Joe Coomer (1941, 1945–1946)
 Adrian Cooper (1991–1993)
 Marquis Cooper (2006–2007)
 Sam Cooper (1933)
 Lou Cordileone (1962–1963)
 Anthony Corley (1984)
 Bob Coronado (1961)
 Thomas Cosgrove (1935)
 Jerricho Cotchery (2011–2013)
 Russell Cotton (1942)
 Steve Courson (1977–1983)
 Brad Cousino (1977)
 Russ Craft (1954–1956)
 Bill Cregar (1947–1948)
 Carl Crennel (1970)
 Larry Critchfield (1933)
 Winfield Croft (1936)
 Da'Mon Cromartie-Smith (2011–2013)
 Marshall Cropper (1967–1969)
 Joe Cugliari (1981)
 Bennie Cunningham (1976–1985)
 Ron Curl (1972)
 Don Currivan (1944)
 Roy Curry (1963)
 Matt Cushing (1999–2004)
 Randy Cuthbert (1993–1994)

D

 Bernard Dafney (1996)
 Anthony Daigle (1994–1995)
 Ted Dailey (1933)
 Ken Dallafior (1982)
 Willie Daniel (1961–1966)
 James Daniels (2022–present)
 Charles Davenport (1992–1994)
 Najeh Davenport (2006–2008)
 Bill Davidson (1937–1939)
 Kenny Davidson (1990–1993)
 Art Davis (1956–1957)
 Bruce Davis (2008)
 Carey Davis (2007–2009)
 Charlie Davis (1974)
 Dave Davis (1973)
 Henry Davis (1970–1974)
 Lorenzo Davis (1990)
 Paul Davis (1947–1948)
 Robert Davis (1946–1951)
 Russell Davis (1979–1983)
 Sam Davis (1967–1980)
 Sean Davis (2016–2020)
 Steve Davis (1972–1974)
 Travis Davis (1999)
 Tommy Dawkins (1987)
 Dermontti Dawson (1988–2000)
 Len Dawson (1957–1959)
 Nick DeCarbo (1933)
 Art DeCarlo (1953)
 David DeCastro (2012–2020)
 Jonathan Dekker (2007)
 Harry Deligianis (1999)
 Jack Deloplaine (1976–1979)
 DeLuca (1935)
 George Demko (1961)
 John Dempsey (1934)
 Carmine DePascal (1945)
 Henry DePaul (1945)
 Dick Deranek (1948)
 Dean Derby (1957–1961)
 Darrell Dess (1958)
 Buddy Dial (1959–1963)
 Charlie Dickey (1987)
 Richard Dickinson (1959)
 Mark Didio (1992)
 Luby DiMeolo (1934)
 Dean Dingman (1991)
 Johnnie Dirden (1981)
 Dennis Dixon (2008–2010)
 George Dobash (1942)
 John Dockery (1972–1973)
 Dale Dodrill (1951–1959)
 Les Dodson (1941)
 John Doehring (1935)
 Chris Doering (2003–2004)
 Cliff Dolaway (1935)
 Richard "Dick" Dolly (1941–1945)
 Allen "Al" Donelli (1941–1942)
 Rick Donnalley (1981–1983)
 Thom Dornbrook (1978–1980)
 Kevin Dotson (2020–present)
 Forrest Douds (1933–1934)
 Bob Dougherty (1958)
 Bob Douglas (1938)
 Dick Doyle (1955)
 Theo Doyle (1938–1945)
 Al Drulis (1947)
 Rick Druschel (1974–1975)
 Bill Dudley (1942, 1945–1946)
 Roger Duffy (1998–2001)
 Len Dugan (1939)
 Gilford "Cliff" Duggan (1944)
 Paul Duhart (1945)
 Chuckie Dukes (1993)
 Craig Dunaway (1983)
 Karl Dunbar (1990)
 Maurice Duncan (1954–1956)
 Tony Dungy (1977–1978)
 David Dunn (1998)
 Gary Dunn (1976–1987)
 Bud Dupree (2015–2020) 
 Bill Dutton (1946)
 Jonathan Dwyer (2010–2013)

E

 Nick Eason (2007–2010)
 Vic Eaton (1955)
 Eric Ebron (2020–2021)
 Terry Echols (1984)
 Shayne Edge (1996)
 Terrell Edmunds (2018–present)
 Trey Edmunds (2018–2021)
 Dave Edwards (1985–1987)
 Glen Edwards (1971–1977)
 Troy Edwards (1999–2001)
 Donnie Elder (1986)
 Larry Elkins (1969)
 Jim Elliott (1967)
 Marv Ellstrom (1935)
 Leo Elter (1953–1959)
 Carlos Emmons (1996–1999)
 Paul Engebretsen (1933)
 Rick Engles (1977)
 Rich Erenberg (1984–1986)
 Paul Ernster (2008)
 Trai Essex (2005–2011)
 Tim Euhus (2006)
 Donald Evans (1990–1993)
 Jon Evans (1958–1958)
 Ray Evans (1948)
 Walt Evans (1983–1988)
 Thomas Everett (1987–1991)

F

 Ron Fair (1990)
 Alan Faneca (1998–2007)
 Hebron Fangupo (2013)
 John Farquhar (1996)
 Venice Farrar (1938–1939)
 Scrapper Farrell (1938)
 James Farrior (2002–2011)
 Kris Farris (1999)
 Ta'ase Faumui (1994–1995)
 Steve Fedell (1981–1982)
 Nick Feher (1955)
 Bob Ferguson (1962–1963)
 Jim Ferranti (1980)
 Lou Ferry (1952–1955)
 John Fiala (1997–2002)
 Ralph Fife (1946)
 Deon Figures (1993–1996)
 Dan Fike (1993)
 Francis Filchock (1938)
 Jim Files (1976)
 Jim Finks (1949–1955)
 Mike Finn (1992–1993)
 B. J. Finney (2016–2019, 2021)
 Doug Fisher (1969–1970)
 Everett Fisher (1940)
 Ray Fisher (1959)
 Max Fiske (1936–1939)
 Minkah Fitzpatrick (2019–present)
 Dick Flanagan (1953–1955)
 Tom Fletcher (1966–1968)
 Lethon Flowers (1995–2002)
 Fred Foggie (1993–1994)
 Lee Folkins (1965)
 Vernon Foltz (1945)
 Larry Foote (2002–2008, 2010–2013)
 Darryl Ford (1992)
 Henry Ford (1956–1957)
 Moses Ford (1987)
 Todd Fordham (2003)
 John Foruria (1967–1968)
 Barry Foster (1990–1994)
 Jayson Foster (2008)
 Ramon Foster (2009–2019)
 Sid Fournet (1957)
 Keyaron Fox (2008–2010)
 Sam Francis (1939-1939)
 Joe Frank (1943)
 Andre Frazier (2005–2009)
 Lorenzo Freeman (1987–1990)
 Ernest French (1982)
 Pat Freiermuth (2021–present)
 Len Frketich (1945)
 Chris Fuamatu-Maafala (1998–2002)
 Dick Fugler (1952)
 Randy Fuller (1995–1997)
 Ed Fullerton (1953)
 John "Frenchy" Fuqua (1970–1976)
 Steve Furness (1972-1980)

G

 Bob Gaddis (1975)
 Bobby Gage (1949–1950)
 Larry Gagner (1966–1970)
 Wentford Gaines (1976–1978)
 Joey Galloway (2009)
 Kendall Gammon (1992–1995)
 Wayne Gandy (1999–2002)
 Bob Gaona (1953–1956)
 Chris Gardocki (2004–2006)
 Bill Garnaas (1946–1948)
 Reggie Garrett (1974–1976)
 Gregg Garrity (1983–1984)
 Terence Garvin (2013)
 Keith Gary (1983–1988)
 Joe Gasparella (1948–1951)
 Charlie Gauer (1943)
 Jason Gavadza (2000)
 William Gay (2007–2011, 2013–2017)
 Cory Geason (1999–2001)
 Byron Gentry (1937–1939)
 Chris George (1996)
 Matt George (1998)
 Roy Gerela (1971–1978)
 Joe Geri (1949–1951)
 Oliver Gibson (1995–1998)
 Thaddeus Gibson (2010)
 Marcus Gilbert (2011–2018)
 Johnny Gildea (1935–1937)
 Jason Gildon (1994–2003)
 Scoop Gillespie (1984)
 Joe Gilliam (1972–1975)
 Harry Gilmer (1957–1960)
 David Gilreath (2012)
 Earl Girard (1957–1958)
 Joe Glamp (1947–1949)
 Glenn Glass (1962–1963)
 Fred Glatz (1956)
 Gary Glick (1956–1959)
 Junior Glymph (2006)
 Clark Goff (1940)
 Robert Golden (2012–2017)
 George Gonda (1942)
 Pete Gonzalez (1998–1999)
 John Goodman (1980–1985)
 John Goodson (1982)
 Joey Goodspeed (2000)
 Walt Gorinski (1946)
 Preston Gothard (1985–1988)
 Mace Gouldsby (1989)
 Cornell Gowdy (1987–1988)
 Theo Grabinski (1939–1940)
 Bruce Gradkowski (2013–2016)
 Neil Graff (1976–1977)
 Jeff Graham (1991–1993)
 Kenny Graham (1970)
 Kent Graham (2000)
 Russell Graham (1984)
 Gordon Gravelle (1972–1976)
 Ray Graves (1943)
 Tom Graves (1979)
 Sam Gray (1946–1947)
 Bobby Joe Green (1960–1961)
 Eric Green (1990–1994)
 Isaiah Green (2012–2013)
 Johnny Green (1960)
 Kendrick Green (2021–present)
 Joe Greene (1969-1981)
 Kevin Greene (1993–1995)
 Tracy Greene (1995)
 Norm Greeney (1934–1935)
 L. C. Greenwood (1969–1981)
 Larry Griffin (1987–1993)
 John Grigas (1944)
 Xavier Grimble (2016–2019)
 Tyler Grisham (2009–2011)
 Earl Gros (1967–1969)
 Randy Grossman (1974–1981)
 Bob Gunderman (1957)
 Riley Gunnels (1965–1966)
 John Guy (1992–1993)

H

 Walt Hackett (1969–1970)
 Elmer Hackney (1941)
 Joe Haden (2017–2021)
 Clark Haggans (2000–2007)
 Mike Haggerty (1967–1970)
 Byron Haines (1937)
 Russell Hairston (1987)
 Dick Haley (1961-1964)
 Delton Hall (1987–1991)
 Ronnie Hall (1959–1960)
 Alan Haller (1992–1993)
 Jack Ham (1971–1982)
 Cobi Hamilton (2016)
 Casey Hampton (2001–2012)
 Phil Handler (1944)
 Bob Hanlon (1949)
 Craig Hanneman (1971–1973)
 Terry Hanratty (1969–1976)
 Tom Hanson (1938)
 Harbes (1935)
 Lem Harkey (1955)
 Matt Harper (1998)
 Maurice Harper (1941)
 Billy Harris (1937)
 Franco Harris (1972–1983)
 Lou Harris (1968–1969)
 Najee Harris (2021–present)
 Orien Harris (2006)
 Ra'Shon "Sonny" Harris (2009)
 Tim Harris (1983)
 Chester David "Tuff" Harris (2009–2010)
 Arnold Harrison (2005–2009)
 Bob Harrison (1964)
 James Harrison (2002, 2004–2012, 2014–2017)
 Nolan Harrison (1997–1999)
 Reggie Harrison (1974–1977)
 Jeff Hartings (2001–2006)
 Howard Hartley (1949–1952)
 Tom Hartnett (1980) 
 Justin Hartwig (2008–2009)
 Pressley Harvin III (2021–present)
 Carlton Haselrig (1989–1993)
 Jim Haslett (1997–1999)
 J. C. Hassenauer (2020–present)
 Andre Hastings (1993–1996)
 Courtney Hawkins (1997–2000)
 Greg Hawthorne (1979–1983)
 Henry Hayduk (1935)
 Jonathan Hayes (1994–1996)
 Rudy Hayes (1959–1962)
 Verron Haynes (2002–2007)
 George Hays (1950–1952)
 Ken Hebert (1968)
 Ernie Hefferle (1965)
 Bill Hegarty (1953)
 Don Heinrich (1966–1968)
 Paul Held (1954)
 Warren Heller (1934–1936)
 Jon Henderson (1968–1969)
 Dick Hendley (1951)
 Kevin Henry (1993–2000)
 Mike Henry (1959–1962)
 Urban Henry (1964)
 Dick Hensley (1951–1952)
 Ken Henson (1965)
 Anthony Henton (1986, 1988)
 Donald Herron (1989)
 Noah Herron (2005)
 Bill Hewitt (1943)
 Cameron Heyward (2011–present)
 Connor Heyward (2022–present)
 Howard Hickey (1941)
 Alex Highsmith (2020–present)
 Derek Hill (1989–1990)
 Harlon Hill (1962)
 Jimmy Hill (1955)
 Jerry Hillebrand (1968–1970)
 Tony Hills (2008–2010)
 John Hilton (1965–1969)
 Glen Ray Hines (1973)
 Bryan Hinkle (1981–1993)
 Jack Hinkle (1943)
 Mike Hinnant (1988–1989)
 Hal Hinte (1942)
 Chuck Hinton (1964–1971)
 Claude Hipps (1952–1953)
 Joe Hoague (1941–1942)
 Dick Hoak (1961–1970)
 Pat Hodgson (1992–1995)
 Bob Hoel (1935)
 Dave Hoffmann (1993)
 Darrell Hogan (1949–1953)
 Merril Hoge (1987–1993)
 Bob Hohn (1965–1969)
 Chris Hoke (2001–2011)
 Bill Holcomb (1936–1937)
 Ed Holler (1964)
 Corey Holliday (1994–1997)
 Joe Hollingsworth (1949–1951)
 Bernard "Tony" Holm (1933)
 Walt Holmer (1933)
 Earl Holmes (1996–2001)
 Ernie Holmes (1972–1977)
 Melvin Holmes (1971–1973)
 Santonio Holmes (2006–2009)
 Evander "Ziggy" Hood (2009–2013)
 Frank Hood (1933)
 Allen Hooker (1976)
 Dwayne Hooper (1985)
 Chris Hope (2002–2005)
 Bill Hornick (1947)
 Garry Howe (1991–1992)
 Glen Howe (1985)
 Cal Hubbard (1936)
 Chris Hubbard (2013–2017)
 Gene Hubka (1947)
 Alan Huff (1987)
 Chris Hughes (1986)
 David Hughes (1986)
 Dennis Hughes (1970–1971)
 Dick Hughes (1957)
 George Hughes (1950–1955)
 Jed Hughes (1984–1988)
 Jay Hull (1983)
 Al Humphrey (1976)
 Art Hunter (1965)
 Richard Huntley (1998–2000)
 Bill Hurley (1980)

I

 Tunch Ilkin (1980–1992)
 John Itzel (1945)
 Corey Ivy (2009)
 Frank Ivy (1940)
 Khori Ivy (2002)
 Mortty Ivy (2011)
 Chidi Iwuoma (2002–2006)
 George Izo (1966)

J
 
 Myles Jack (2022)
 Alonzo Jackson (2003–2004)
 Earnest Jackson (1986–1988)
 John Jackson (1988–1997)
 Lenzie Jackson (2001)
 Cam Jacobs (1985)
 Omar Jacobs (2006)
 Dan James (1960–1966)
 Clarence Janecek (1933)
 Val Jansante (1944–1951)
 Toimi Jarvi (1945)
 Ralph Jecha (1956)
 Roy Jefferson (1965–1969)
 Tom Jelley (1951–1952)
 A. J. Jenkins (1989–1990)
 John Jenkins (1998)
 Erik Jensen (2005)
 Tony Jeter (1966–1968)
 Johnson (1935)
 Bill Johnson (1995–1996)
 Brandon Johnson (2012)
 Charles Johnson (1994–1998)
 D. J. Johnson (1989–1993)
 David Johnson (2009–2013)
 Diontae Johnson (2019-present)
 Jarrod Johnson (1991)
 Jason Johnson (1989)
 John Henry Johnson (1960–1965)
 Jovon Johnson (2006)
 Malcolm Johnson (1999–2001)
 Norm Johnson (1995–1998)
 Ron Johnson (1978–1984)
 Tim Johnson (1987–1989)
 Troy Johnson (1988)
 Will Johnson (2012–2013)
 Chester "Swede" Johnston (1939–1940)
 Rex Johnston (1960)
 Aaron Jones (1988–1992)
 Art Jones (1941, 1945)
 Bruce Jones (1987)
 Donta Jones (1995–1998)
 Felix Jones (2013)
 Gary Jones (1990–1994)
 George Jones (1997)
 Jarvis Jones (2013–2016)
 Landry Jones (2013–2017)
 Mike Jones (2001–2002)
 Victor Jones (1993–1994)
 Darin Jordan (1988)
 Tim Jorden (1992–1993)
 Terrance Joseph (1998)

K

 Royal Kahler (1941)
 George Kakasic (1936–1939)
 Dave Kalina (1970–1971)
 Todd Kalis (1994)
 John Kapele (1960–1962)
 Jeremy Kapinos (2010–2012)
 John Karcis (1936–1938)
 Ed Karpowich (1936–1940)
 Ted Karras (1958–1959)
 George Kavel (1934)
 Tom Keane (1965)
 Tom Keating (1973)
 Brett Keisel (2002, 2004–2014)
 Craig Keith (1993–1994)
 Marv Kellum (1974–1976)
 Jim Kelly (1964)
 Chad Kelsay (1999)
 Mose Kelsch (1933–1934)
 Chris Kemoeatu (2005–2011)
 Jack Kemp (1957–1958)
 Ray Kemp (1933)
 George Kennard (1957)
 John Kennerson (1962)
 Gary Kerkorian (1952)
 Brady Keys (1961–1967)
 Walter Kichefski (1940–1944)
 Max Kielbasa (1946–1947)
 Walt Kiesling (1937–1961)
 George Kiick (1940–1945)
 Miles Killebrew (2021–present)
 Pat Killorin (1966)
 Frank Kilroy (1943)
 Frank Kimble (1945)
 Carlos King (1998)
 Justin King (2012)
 Phil King (1964)
 Mark Kirchner (1983)
 Ken Kirk (1962)
 Levon Kirkland (1992–2000)
 Travis Kirschke (2004–2009)
 Ben Kish (1943)
 Ed Kissell (1952–1955)
 Earl Klapstein (1946)
 Dick Klein (1961)
 Jack Klotz (1959)
 John Klumb (1940)
 Daryl Knox (1987)
 Bob Kohrs (1980–1985)
 Jon Kolb (1969–1991)
 Elmer Kolberg (1941)
 Chris Kolodziejski (1984)
 John Kondrla (1945)
 Ken Kortas (1965–1969)
 Jules Koshlap (1945)
 Rich Kotite (1968)
 Martin Kottler (1933)
 Matt Kranchick (2004–2005)
 Dan Kreider (2000–2007)
 Joe Kresky (1935)
 Clint Kriewaldt (2003–2007)
 Bill Krisher (1958–1959)
 Mike Kruczek (1976–1979)
 Joe Krupa (1956–1964)
 Larry Krutko (1958–1962)
 John Kuhn (2006)
 Christian Kuntz (2021–present)
 Justin Kurpeikis (2001–2006)
 Roy Kurrasch (1948)
 Zvonimir Kvaternik (1934)

L

 Steve Lach (1946–1947)
 Dave LaCrosse (1977)
 Pete Ladygo (1952–1954)
 Bill Lajousky (1936)
 Carnell Lake (1989-1998)
 Joe Lamas (1942)
 Frank Lambert (1965–1966)
 Jack Lambert (1974–1984)
 Lowell Lander (1956)
 Mose Lantz (1933)
 Chuck Lanza (1988–1990)
 Dan LaRose (1964)
 Lou Lassahn (1938)
 Dick Lasse (1958–1959)
 Johnny Lattner (1954)
 Ted Laux (1943)
 Hubbard Law (1942–1947)
 Ben Lawrence (1987)
 Bobby Layne (1958–1965)
 Paul Lea (1951)
 DeMarvin Leal (2022–present)
 Bob Leahy (1970–1971)
 Gerald Leahy (1957)
 Bernard Lee (1938)
 Danzell Lee (1987)
 Greg Lee (1988)
 Herman Lee (1957)
 John Lee (1939)
 Dick Leftridge (1966)
 Byron Leftwich (2008, 2010, 2012)
 Doug Legursky (2009–2012, 2015)
 Ray Lemek (1962–1965)
 Matt Lentz (2007)
 Jim Leonard (1942–1945)
 Tim Lester (1995–1998)
 John Letsinger (1933)
 Lou Levanti (1951–1952)
 Jim Levey (1934–1936)
 Art Lewis (1960–1961)
 Frank Lewis (1971–1977)
 Joe Lewis (1958–1960)
 Keenan Lewis (2009–2012)
 Roy Lewis (2008–2009)
 Tim Lewis (1995–2003)
 Dave Liddick (1957)
 Mike Lind (1965–1966)
 Louis Lipps (1984–1991)
 Gene Lipscomb (1961–1962)
 David Little (1981–1992)
 Carl Littlefield (1939–1941)
 Greg Lloyd (1987–1997)
 Steve Loch (1947)
 Charles Lockett (1987–1988)
 Chuck Logan (1964)
 Mike Logan (2001–2006)
 Stefan Logan (2009)
 Bill Long (1949–1950)
 Jim Long (1966)
 Terry Long (1984–1991)
 Ken Longenecker (1960–1961)
 Don Looney (1941–1942)
 Andre Lott (2006)
 John Lott (1987)
 Isaiahh Loudermilk (2021–present)
 Love (1934)
 Duval Love (1992–1994)
 Reggie Lowe (1999)
 Jack Lowther (1945)
 Dick Lucas (1958–1959)
 Jeff Lucas (1987)
 John Lucente (1945)
 Alex Lukachick (1942)
 Bob Luna (1959)
 Booth Lusteg (1968)
 Mitch Lyons (1997–1999)

M

 Bill Mack (1961–1965)
 Rico Mack (1993–1994)
 Bill Mackrides (1953)
 Tommy Maddox (2001–2005)
 Anthony Madison (2006–2011)
 L.E. Madison (1984)
 Mike Magac (1965–1966)
 George Magulick (1944)
 Sean Mahan (2007)
 Frank Maher (1941)
 John Malecki (2011)
 Joe Malkovich (1935)
 Fran Mallick (1965)
 Mark Malone (1980–1987)
 Jim Mandich (1978)
 Ray Mansfield (1963–1976)
 Edgar Manske (1938)
 Rod Manuel (1997–1998)
 Bobby Maples (1971)
 Joseph Maras (1938–1940)
 Basilio Marchi (1934)
 Ted Marchibroda (1953–1957)
 Jerry Marion (1967)
 Henry Marker (1934)
 Jeff Markland (1988)
 Lou Marotti (1944)
 Curtis Marsh (1997)
 Marshie (1934)
 Paul Martha (1964–1969)
 Emerson Martin (1995)
 Johnny Martin (1944)
 Ricky Martin (1981)
 Tee Martin (2000–2001)
 Vernon Martin (1942)
 Grant Mason (2007–2008)
 Bob Masters (1939–1943)
 Walt Masters (1944)
 John Mastrangelo (1947–1948)
 Ed Matesic (1936)
 Joe Matesic (1954)
 Ray Mathews (1951–1959)
 Terance Mathis (2002)
 Frank Mattioli (1946)
 Marv Matuszak (1953–1956)
 Arthur Maulet (2021–present)
 Alvin Maxson (1977–1978)
 Ray May (1967–1969)
 Hayden Mayhew (1936–1938)
 Alvoid Mays (1995)
 Damon Mays (1995)
 Lee Mays (2002–2004, 2006)
 Jerry Mazzanti (1967)
 Fred McAfee (1994–1998)
 Ryan McBean (2007)
 Richie McCabe (1955–1958)
 Art McCaffray (1944–1946)
 Brice McCain (2014)
 Don McCall (1969)
 David McCann (1997)
 John McCarthy (1944)
 Jack McClairen (1953–1960)
 Willie McClung (1955–1957)
 Glenn McCombs (1986)
 Dewey McConnell (1954–1955)
 Jamie McCoy (2011)
 Daniel McCullers (2014–2020)
 Hugh McCullough (1939–1943)
 Karl McDade (1938)
 Edward McDonald (1936)
 Shaun McDonald (2009)
 Coley McDonough (1939–1941)
 Paul McDonough (1938)
 Kenny McEntyre (1995)
 Bryant McFadden (2005–2008, 2010–2011)
 Marv McFadden (1953–1956)
 Anthony McFarland Jr. (2020–2021)
 Ben McGee (1964–1972)
 Rob McGovern (1991)
 Thurman McGraw (1958–1961)
 Tyrone McGriff (1980–1982)
 Sean McHugh (2008–2009)
 Tim McKyer (1994)
 Leon McLaughlin (1966–1968)
 Steve McLendon (2009–2011)
 John McMakin (1972–1974)
 Johnny "Blood" McNally (1934–1939)
 Ed McNamara (1945)
 Bill McPeak (1949–1958)
 Tom McWilliams (1949–1950)
 Ed Meadows (1955)
 Bryant Meeks (1947–1948)
 Charles Mehelich (1946–1951)
 Steve Meilinger (1961)
 Rashard Mendenhall (2008–2011)
 Jamon Meredith (2011)
 Albert "Elmer" Merkovsky (1944–1946)
 Mike Merriweather (1982–1987)
 Max Messner (1964–1965)
 Dennis Meyer (1972–1973)
 John Meyer (1982)
 Ron Meyer (1966)
 Bill Meyers (1984)
 Bill Michael (1957)
 Ed Michaels (1943)
 Lou Michaels (1961–1963)
 Art Michalik (1955–1956)
 John Michelosen (1946–1951)
 Kelvin Middleton (1987)
 Lou Midler (1939)
 Barron Miles (1995)
 Eddie Miles (1990)
 Anthony Miller (2021) 
 Heath Miller (2005–2015)
 Jim Miller (1994–1996)
 Josh Miller (1996–2003)
 Mike Miller (1999–2003)
 Tom Miller (1943)
 Ernie Mills (1991–1996)
 Freddie Milons (2003)
 Henry Minarik (1951)
 Tom Miner (1958–1959)
 Gene Mingo (1969–1970)
 Frank Minini (1949)
 Michael Minter (1987)
 Arthur Moats (2014–2017)
 Dick Modzelewski (1955)
 Ed Modzelewski (1952–1954)
 Dicky Moegle (1960)
 Tony Momsen (1951)
 Henry Mondeaux (2020–2021)
 Dan Moore (2021–present)
 Bucky Moore (1933)
 Lance Moore (2014)
 Mewelde Moore (2008–2011)
 Red Moore (1947–1949)
 Gonzalo Morales (1947–1948)
 Sean Morey (2004–2006)
 Bob Morgan (1967)
 Quincy Morgan (2005)
 Tom Moriarty (1980)
 Earl Morrall (1957–1958)
 Byron Morris (1994–1995)
 Jack Morris (1960)
 Steve Morse (1985)
 Rick Moser (1978–1982)
 Clure Mosher (1942)
 Norm Mosley (1948)
 Paul Moss (1933)
 Marion Motley (1955)
 Norm Mott (1934)
 Derek Moye (2013)
 Sam Mudie (1962)
 Mike Mularkey (1989–1991)
 Lee Mulleneaux (1935–1936)
 Gerry Mullins (1971–1979)
 Ryan Mundy (2008–2011)
 Dick Murley (1956)
 George Murphy (1951)
 Earl Murray (1952)
 Tom Myslinski (1996–2000)

N

 Gern Nagler (1959)
 John Naioti (1942–1945)
 Martin Nance (2008)
 Dick Nardi (1939)
 Greasy Neale (1943)
 Bill Nelsen (1963–1967)
 Darrell Nelson (1984–1985)
 Edmund Nelson (1982–1987)
 Carl Nery (1940–1941)
 Tom Newberry (1995)
 Harry Newsome (1985–1989)
 Armand Niccolai (1934–1942)
 Allen Nichols (1945)
 Bob Nichols (1965)
 Elbie Nickel (1947–1957)
 Hardy Nickerson (1987–1992)
 George Nicksich Jr (1949–1952)
 George Nicksich Sr (1935)
 John Nisby (1957–1961)
 Kent Nix (1967–1969)
 Mike Nixon (1935–1965)
 Mathias Nkwenti (2001–2003)
 Jeffrey Noble (1991–1992)
 Leo Nobile (1948–1949)
 Terry Nofsinger (1961–1964)
 Dan Nolan (1959)
 John Noppenberg (1940–1941)
 Mark Nori (1997)
 Tre Norwood (2021–present)
 John Nosich (1938)
 Shaun Nua (2005–2006)
 Buzz Nutter (1961–1964)
 Jerry Nuzum (1948–1951)

O

 Fran O'Brien (1966–1968)
 Jack O'Brien (1954–1956)
 Mel Odelli (1945)
 Henry Odom (1983)
 Pat O'Donahue (1953–1955)
 Neil O'Donnell (1990–1995)
 John Oehler (1933–1934)
 John Oelerich (1938)
 A.J. Ofodile (1995)
 Chukky Okobi (2001–2006)
 Chukwuma Okorafor (2018–present)
 Chris Oldham (1995–1999)
 Ray Oldham (1978)
 Dan O'Leary (2002)
 Stan Olejniczak (1935)
 Oliver (1935)
 Clarence Oliver (1969–1970)
 Jerry Olsavsky (1989-1997)
 Al Olszewski (1945)
 Gunner Olszewski (2022–present)
 Joe O'Malley (1955–1956)
 Bob O'Neil (1956–1957)
 Dennis Onkotz (1971)
 Dave Opfar (1987)
 Tony Orlandini (1998–2000)
 Bo Orlando (1998)
 Ken Ormiston (1948–1950)
 Jimmy Orr (1958–1960)
 Chuck Ortmann (1951–1952)
 Terry O'Shea (1989–1990)
 Paul Oswald (1987)
 Darrick Owens (1992)

P

 Lonnie Palelei (1993–1995)
 Tyler Palko (2009)
 Jonathan Palmer  (2007)
 Michael Palmer (2013–2014)
 Tom Palmer (1953–1954)
 George Papach (1948–1951)
 Babe Parilli (1971–1973)
 Frank Parker (1968–1969)
 Willie Parker (2004–2009)
 Jeremy Parquet (2007–2009)
 James Parrish (1995)
 Gordon Paschka (1943)
 Frank Pastin (1942)
 Frank Patrick (1948)
 John Patrick (1941–1946)
 Billy Patterson (1940)
 Stan Pavkov (1939–1940)
 Scott Paxson (2006–2009)
 Clarence Peaks (1964–1965)
 Morgan Pears (2003)
 Barry Pearson (1972–1973)
 Preston Pearson (1970–1974)
 Erric Pegram (1995–1996)
 Leon Pense (1945)
 John Perko (1937–1947)
 George Perles (1972–1981)
 Pete Perreault (1962)
 Darren Perry (1992–2006)
 Lowell Perry (1956)
 John Petchel (1945)
 Ted Petersen (1977–1987)
 Todd Peterson (2002)
 John Petrella (1945)
 Ken Phares (1973)
 Marvin Philip (2006–2007)
 George Pickens (2022–present)
 Kenny Pickett (2022–present)
 Joe Pierre (1945–1946)
 Roger Pillath (1966)
 Ed Pine (1965)
 Ray Pinney (1976–1987)
 Rocco Pirro (1940–1941)
 Mel Pittman (1935)
 Dick Plasman (1958–1961)
 George Platukis (1938–1941)
 Mark Plevelich (1986)
 Kirk Pointer (1996)
 Frank Pokorny (1985)
 Troy Polamalu (2003–2014)
 Frank Pollard (1980–1988)
 John Popovich (1944–1945)
 Joey Porter (1999–2006)
 Al Postus (1945)
 Hank Poteat (2000–2002)
 Myron Pottios (1961–1965)
 Bill Potts (1934)
 Mike Potts (2008)
 Ernie Pough (1976–1977)
 Maurkice Pouncey (2010–2014, 2016–2020)
 Shar Pourdanesh (1999–2000)
 Ryan Powdrell (2009)
 Tim Powell (1966)
 John Powers (1962–1965)
 Bill Priatko (1957)
 Rollin Putzier (1988)

Q

 Jesse Quatse (1933–1934)
 Jerry Quick (1986–1987)
 Jeff Quinn (1982)
 Mike Quinn (1997)

R

 Carroll Raborn (1936–1937)
 Alex Rado (1934)
 George Rado (1935–1937)
 Vince Ragunas (1949)
 Matt Raich (2004–2006)
 Pete Rajkovich (1934)
 Buster Ramsey (1962–1964)
 Antwaan Randle El (2002–2005, 2010)
 Walt Rankin (1944)
 Walter Rasby (1994–2004)
 Leo Raskowski (1933)
 Randy Rasmussen (1984–1986)
 Eric Ravotti (1994–1996)
 Israel Raybon (1996)
 Dave Reavis (1974–1975)
 Bert Rechichar (1960)
 Redding (1935)
 Isaac Redman (2009–2011)
 Jeff Reed (2002–2010)
 Dan Reeder (1986–1987)
 Cad Reese (1934–1936)
 Jerry Reese (1988)
 Jordan Reffet (2008–2009)
 John Reger (1955–1963)
 Willie Reid (2006–2007)
 Will Renfro (1960)
 Joe Repko (1946–1947)
 Jared Retkofsky (2008–2009)
 Randy Reutershan (1978)
 Ray Reutt (1943)
 Billy Reynolds (1958)
 Jim Reynolds (1946)
 Reznichak (1935)
 Don Rhodes (1933)
 Loran "Dave" Ribble (1934–1935)
 Perry Richards (1957)
 Huey Richardson (1991)
 Terry Richardson (1996)
 Rodney Richmond (1987)
 Tom Ricketts (1989–1991)
 Bill Riehl (1979-1981)
 Jay Riemersma (2003–2004)
 John Rienstra (1986–1990)
 Dick Riffle (1941–1942)
 Avon Riley (1987)
 Cameron Riley (1987)
 Gabriel Rivera (1983)
 Jack Roberts (1934)
 Bill Robinson (1952)
 Ed Robinson (1994)
 Gil Robinson (1933)
 Jack Robinson (1938)
 Willy Robinson (2000–2003)
 Marshall Robnett (1944)
 Mike Rodak (1942)
 Mark Rodenhauser (1998)
 John Rodgers (1982–1984)
 Ben Roethlisberger (2004–2021)
 Fran Rogel (1950–1957)
 Cullen Rogers (1946)
 Rondour (1935)
 Gene Ronzani (1954)
 Harvey Rooker (1948)
 J.P. Rooney (1934–1935)
 Andres Roosna (1996–1997)
 Dedrick Roper (2004–2005)
 Jim Rorison (1938)
 Oliver Ross (2000–2004)
 Allen Rossum (2007)
 Pete Rostosky (1983–1986)
 Tom Rouen (2002)
 Bob Rowley (1963)
 John Rowser (1970–1973)
 Mark Royals (1992–1994)
 Orpheus Roye (1996–2009)
 Aubrey Rozzell (1957)
 Eddie Rucinski (1944)
 Mason Rudolph (2019–present)
 Grey Ruegamer (2000)
 Guy Ruff (1982–1983)
 Ernie Ruple (1968–1969)
 Andy Russell (1963–1976)
 Gary Russell (2007–2009)
 Rod Rust (1989)
 Rod Rutherford (2005)
 Ed Ryan (1948)

S

 Steve Sader (1943)
 Troy Sadowski (1997–1998)
 Paul Salata (1951)
 John Sample (1961–1962)
 Don Samuel (1949–1951)
 Carl Samuelson (1948–1951)
 Kuan Sanchez (2006–2007)
 Lupe Sanchez (1986–1988)
 Sigurd Sandberg (1935–1937)
 Emmanuel Sanders (2010–2013)
 Wayne Sandefur (1936–1937)
 Chuck Sanders (1986–1987)
 Jack Sanders (1940–1942)
 Curtis Sandig (1942)
 Mike Sandusky (1957–1965)
 Theron Sapp (1963–1965)
 Bill Saul (1964–1968)
 Sylvan Saumer (1934)
 Weslye Saunders (2011)
 Charley Scales (1960–1961)
 Shawn Scales (1998)
 Jack Scarbath (1956–1957)
 Bernard Scherer (1939)
 John Schiechl (1941–1942)
 John Schmidt (1940)
 Ricky Schmitt (2008)
 Bob Schmitz (1961–1966)
 Mike Schneck (1999–2004)
 Bob Schnelker (1961–1962)
 Karl Schuelke (1939)
 Eberle Schultz (1941–1944)
 Elmer Schwartz (1933)
 John Schweder (1951–1955)
 Glenn Scolnik (1973)
 Chad Scott (1997–2004)
 Chris Scott (2010–2011)
 Jonathan Scott (2010–2011)
 Patrick Scott (1994–1996)
 Wilbert Scott (1961)
 Joe Scudero (1960)
 Todd Seabaugh (1983–1984)
 Charley Seabright (1946–1950)
 Ray Seals (1994–1996)
 Leon Searcy (1992–1995)
 Vic Sears (1943)
 Mike Sebastian (1935)
 Richard Seigler (2005–2006)
 Warren Seitz (1986)
 Bernie Semes (1944)
 Daniel Sepulveda (2007–2011)
 Brent Sexton (1975–1977)
 George Shaffer (1933)
 Ron Shanklin (1970–1974)
 Rick Sharp (1970–1971)
 Bobby Shaw (1998–2001)
 Ryan Shazier (2014–2019)
 Chris Sheffield (1986–1987)
 Donnie Shell (1974–1987)
 Richard Shelton (1990–1993)
 Charlie Shepard (1956)
 Leslie Shepherd (1993)
 Stan Sheriff (1954)
 Alex "Allie" Sherman (1943)
 Bob Sherman (1964–1965)
 Ray Sherman (1998)
 Dezmond Sherrod (2008–2009)
 Burrell Shields (1954)
 Scott Shields (1999–2000)
 Dick Shiner (1968–1969)
 Jerry Shipkey (1948–1952)
 Bill Shockley (1968)
 Jim Shorter (1969)
 Bret Shugarts (1987)
 Hubert Shurtz (1948)
 Don Shy (1967–1968)
 John Simerson (1958–1959)
 Tracy Simien (1989)
 Milt Simington (1942)
 Jason Simmons (1998–2001)
 Jerry Simmons (1965–1966)
 Kendall Simmons (2002–2003, 2005–2008)
 Bob Simms (1962)
 Jackie Simpson (1961–1962)
 Tim Simpson (1993–1994)
 Willie Simpson (1961)
 Darryl Sims (1985–1986)
 Frank Sinkovitz (1947–1952)
 George Sirochman (1942)
 Vince Sites (1936–1937)
 Paul Skansi (1983)
 Joe Skladany (1934–1947)
 Nick Skorich (1943–1957)
 Ed Skoronski (1935–1936)
 Walt Slater (1947)
 Stan Smagala (1992)
 Alex Smail (1952)
 Fred Small (1985)
 Joe Smaltz (1960–1963)
 Aaron Smith (1999–2011)
 Anthony Smith (2006–2008)
 Ben Smith (1934–1935)
 Billy Ray Smith, Sr. (1958–1960)
 Bobby Smith (1966)
 Dave Smith (1970–1972)
 Hal Smith (1958)
 Jeff Smith (2002)
 Jim Smith (1977–1982)
 Kevin Smith (1991)
 Laverne Smith (1977)
 Marvel Smith (2000–2008)
 Ron Smith (1966)
 Steve Smith (1966)
 Stu Smith (1937–1938)
 Truett Smith (1950–1951)
 JuJu Smith-Schuster (2019–2021)
 Benny Snell (2019–present)
 Ray Snell (1984–1985)
 Bill Snyder (1934–1935)
 Bob Snyder (1955–1956)
 John Sodaski (1970)
 Bob Soleau (1964)
 Ariel Solomon (1991–1995)
 George Somers (1941–1942)
 Ross Sorce (1945)
 Wilbur "Bill" Sortet (1933–1940)
 Frank Souchak
 Souffley (1935)
 Matt Spaeth (2007–2010, 2013–2015)
 Chad Spann (2011)
 Todd Spencer (1984–1985)
 John Spezzaferro (1976)
 Robert Spillane (2019–2022)
 Jack Spinks (1952–1953)
 Brian St. Pierre (2003–2007)
 Jeremy Staat (1998–2000)
 Jon Staggers (1970–1972)
 Brenden StaI (1995–1999)
 Duce Staley (2004–2006)
 John Stallworth (1974–1987)
 Ronald Stanley (2005–2006)
 Jack Stanton (1961–1962)
 Darnell Stapleton (2007–2009)
 Pat Stark (1954–1956)
 Rohn Stark (1995)
 Max Starks (2004–2012)
 Ben Starret (1941)
 Larry Station (1986)
 Ernie Stautner (1950–1964)
 Joel Steed (1992–1999)
 Ernest Steele (1943)
 Ron Stehouwer (1960–1964)
 Brian Stenger (1969–1973)
 Paul Stenn (1947)
 Jamain Stephens (1996–1998)
 Kent Stephenson (1992–2000)
 Dean Steward (1943)
 George Stewart (1989–1991)
 Kordell Stewart (1995–2002)
 Ken Stilley (1959–1963)
 John Stock (1956–1957)
 Mark Stock (1989)
 Ed Stofko (1945)
 Dwight Stone (1987–1994)
 Matt Storm (1996)
 Cliff Stoudt (1977–1983)
 Glen Stough (1945)
 Tyronne Stowe (1987–1990)
 Eli Strand (1966)
 Rick Strom (1989–1993)
 Walter Strosser (1942)
 George Strugar (1962)
 Art Strutt (1935–1936)
 Dan Stryzinski (1990–1991)
 Justin Strzelczyk (1990–1999)
 Nick Studen (1945)
 Russell Stuvaints (2003–2005)
 Steve Suhey (1948–1949)
 Shaun Suisham (2010–2014)
 George Sulima (1952–1956)
 Chris Sullivan (2000)
 Frank Sullivan (1940)
 Robert Sullivan (1947)
 Frank Summers (2009)
 Charley Sumner (1969–1972)
 Sal Sunseri (1982)
 Don Sutherin (1959–1960)
 Cameron Sutton (2017–2022)
 Mike Sutton (1984-1984)
 Ricky Sutton (1993)
 John Swain (1985–1986)
 Lynn Swann (1974–1982)
 Limas Sweed (2008–2009)
 Calvin Sweeney (1979–1987)
 Jim Sweeney (1996–1999)
 Willie Sydnor (1982)
 Stevenson Sylvester (2010–2013)
 Walt Szot (1949–1950)

T

 Bill Tanguay (1933)
 Maa Tanuvasa (1994)
 George Tarasovic (1952–1963)
 Jess Tatum (1938)
 Eric Taylor (2004–2005)
 Hugh Taylor (1966–1968)
 Ike Taylor (2003–2015)
 Jim Taylor (1956–1957)
 Lionel Taylor (1970–1976)
 Mike Taylor (1968–1969)
 Lou Tepe (1953–1955)
 Nat Terry (1978)
 Ray Tesser (1933–1935)
 Larry Tharpe (2000)
 Ryan Thelwell (1999)
 Yancey Thigpen (1992–1997)
 Ben Thomas (1988)
 Cam Thomas (2014–2015)
 Clendon Thomas (1962–1968)
 J. T. Thomas (1973–1981)
 Shamarko Thomas (2013–2016)
 Tuffy Thompson (1937–1938)
 Donnel Thompson (2000–2001)
 Leroy Thompson (1991–1993)
 Tommy Thompson (1940)
 Weegie Thompson (1984–1989)
 Sidney Thornton (1977–1981)
 Bob Thurbon (1943–1944)
 Andrae Thurman (2004)
 Morgan Tiller (1945)
 Lawrence Timmons (2007–2016)
 Sid Tinsley (1945)
 George Titus (1946)
 Silas J. Titus (1945)
 Loren Toews (1973–1983)
 Charley Tolar (1959)
 Lou Tomasetti (1939–1940)
 Andy Tomasic (1942, 1946)
 Mike Tomczak (1993–1999)
 Dick Tomlinson (1950–1952)
 Clarence Tommerson (1938–1939)
 LaVern Torgeson (1962–1968)
 John Tosi (1939)
 Erik Totten (2002)
 Fitzgerald Toussaint (2015–2017)
 Deshea Townsend (1998–2009)
 Tom Tracy (1958–1963)
 David Trout (1981–1987)
 Mitchell Trubisky (2022–present)
 Lou Tsoutsouvas (1938)
 B.J. Tucker (2003)
 Erroll Tucker (1986)
 Anthony Tuggle (1985–1987)
 Stephon Tuitt (2014–2020)
 Jerame Tuman (1999–2007)
 Dan Turk (1985–1986)
 John Turley (1935–1936)
 Trevis Turner (2011)
 Rich Tylski (2000–2001)
 Joe Tyrrell (1955)
 Tim Tyrrell (1989)

U

 David Upchurch (2003)
 Paul Uram (1972–1981) 
 Kraig Urbik (2009)

V

 Valenti (1935)
 Zack Valentine (1979–1981)
 Bob Valesente (1990–1991)
 Bruce Van Dyke (1967–1973)
 Lenny Vandermade (2004)
 Frank Varrichione (1955–1960)
 Harp Vaughan (1934)
 Elton Veals (1984)
 Craig Veasey (1990–1991)
 Ross Ventrone (2015–2016)
 Michael Vick (2015)
 Vic Vidoni (1935–1936)
 Alejandro Villanueva (2014–2020)
 Justin Vincent (2007–2009)
 Keydrick Vincent (2001–2004)
 Shawn Vincent (1991)
 Stahle Vincent (1972)
 Kimo von Oelhoffen (2000–2005)
 Lloyd Voss (1966–1971)
 Mike Vrabel (1997–2000)

W

 Bob Wade (1968)
 Tommy Wade (1964–1965)
 Clint Wager (1944)
 Mike Wagner (1971–1980)
 Bobby Walden (1968–1977)
 Gerran Walker (2007)
 Richard Walker (1978–1981)
 Sammy Walker (1991–1992)
 J. T. Wall (2003–2004)
 Cody Wallace (2013–2016)
 Levi Wallace (2022–present)
 Mike Wallace (2009–2012)
 Ray Wallace (1989)
 Rian Wallace (2005–2006)
 Will Walls (1962–1963)
 Bill Walsh (1949–1954)
 Ted Walton (1980)
 Hines Ward (1998–2011)
 Buist "Buss" Warren (1945)
 Greg Warren (2005–2011)
 Jaylen Warren (2022–present}
 Xavier Warren (1987)
 Anthony Washington (1981–1982)
 Clarence Washington (1969–1971)
 Dewayne Washington (1998–2003)
 James Washington (2018-2021)
 Nate Washington (2005–2008)
 Robert Washington (1987)
 Sam Washington (1982–1985)
 Tom Watkins (1968)
 Allan Watson (1970)
 Sid Watson (1955–1957)
 Derek Watt (2020–present)
 T. J. Watt (2017–present)
 B. W. Webb (2014)
 Elnardo Webster (1992)
 George Webster (1972–1973)
 Mike Webster (1974–1988)
 Thurlow Weed (1955)
 Henry Weinberg (1934)
 Izzy Weinstock (1937–1938)
 Henry "Heinie" Weisenbaugh (1935)
 Billy Wells (1957–1958)
 Joe Wendlick (1941)
 Ralph Wenzel (I) (1940–1942)
 Ralph Wenzel (II) (1966–1971)
 Ed Westfall (1933)
 Damon Wetzel (1935)
 Markus Wheaton (2013–2016)
 Ernie Wheeler (1939)
 Tommy Whelan (1933)
 Mark Whipple (2004–2006)
 Byron White (1938)
 Dwight White (1971–1980)
 Paul White (1947)
 Joe Wiehl (1935)
 Paul Wiggins (1997)
 J.R. Wilburn (1966–1970)
 Solomon Wilcots (1992)
 Jack Wiley (1946–1950)
 Eric Wilkerson (1989)
 Albert Williams (1987)
 Brandon Williams (2009)
 Dave Williams (1973)
 DeAngelo Williams (2015–2016)
 Don Williams (1941)
 Eric Williams (1983–1986)
 Erwin Williams (1969)
 Gerald Williams (1986–1994)
 Jerrol Williams (1989–1992)
 Joe Williams (1987)
 Joe J. Williams (1939)
 John L. Williams (1994–1995)
 Payton Williams (2000–2001)
 Ray Williams (1987)
 Renauld Williams (2010)
 Robert Williams (1983–1984)
 Sidney Williams (1969)
 Vince Williams (2013–2020)
 Warren Williams (1988–1992)
 Willie Williams (1993–2005)
 Fred Williamson (1960)
 Keith Willis (1982–1987, 1989–1991)
 Billy Wilson (1938)
 Cedrick Wilson (2005–2007)
 Frank Wilson (1981–1982)
 Gordon Wilson (1944)
 Kion Wilson (2013)
 Chuck Winfrey (1972)
 Brad Wing (2014)
 Blake Wingle (1983–1985)
 Dennis Winston (1977–1986)
 Al Wistert (1943)
 Ahkello Witherspoon (2021–present)
 Mike Withycombe (1991)
 Jon Witman (1996–2001)
 Jim Wolf (1974–1975)
 Craig Wolfley (1980–1989)
 Will Wolford (1996–1998)
 Joe Womack (1962–1964)
 Ken Woodard (1987)
 David Woodley (1984–1985)
 LaMarr Woodley (2007–2013)
 Dwayne Woodruff (1979–1990)
 Al Woods (2011–2013)
 Donovan Woods (2008–2009)
 Rick Woods (1982–1986)
 Marv Woodson (1964–1969)
 Rod Woodson (1987–1996)
 Donnell Woolford (1997)
 Jason Worilds (2010–2011)
 Tim Worley (1989–1993)
 John "Dutch" Woudenberg (1940–1942)
 Lud Wray (1945)
 Lowe Wren (1960)
 Anthony Wright (1999)
 Destry Wright (2000)
 Al Wukits (1943–1945)
 Frank Wydo (1947–1951)

Y

 Al Young (1971–1972)
 Dick Young (1957–1958)
 Theo Young (1987)
 Walter Young (2004–2006)
 Paul Younger (1958)
 John Yurchey (1940)

Z

 Stan Zajdel (1951–1952)
 Silvio Zaninelli (1934–1937)
 Zeher (1935)
 Amos Zereoué (1999–2003)
 Jeff Zgonina (1993–1994)
 Leroy Zimmerman (1943-1943)
 Joe Zombek (1954–1955)
 Frank Zoppetti (1941)

See also
List of Pittsburgh Steelers starting quarterbacks
List of Pittsburgh Steelers first-round draft picks
List of Pittsburgh Steelers head coaches
List of Pittsburgh Steelers broadcasters
List of Pittsburgh Steelers figures in broadcasting

External links
Pittsburgh Steelers all-time roster

Pitt

players